Bronwyn Jane Pike  (born 25 January 1956) is a former  Australian politician.  She was Minister for Education in Victoria in the Brumby Government, and was the Member of Parliament for Melbourne from 1999 to 2012.

Early life
Prior to entering Parliament, Pike worked as a teacher, a community services manager and as the Director of the Unit of Justice and Social Responsibility in the Uniting Church. She is also a former Board Director of Greenpeace Australia. Pike has a long history of advocating for social change, equality and the disadvantaged.

Pike has a son, Paul Coats, who is a former University of Melbourne Postgraduate Association President and an active socialist.

Political career

Pike entered politics in 1999, at age 43.  She was appointed the Minister for Housing and Aged Care and Minister Assisting the Health Minister in the government of Steve Bracks. In 2002 she was appointed as Minister for Community Services and Minister Assisting the Premier on Community Building.

In May 2007, Pike became the longest-serving female minister in Victoria's history, along with Lynne Kosky.

Pike announced her resignation from parliament on 7 May 2012 which triggered a Melbourne by-election. Labor retained the seat, with Jennifer Kanis narrowly defeating the Greens candidate, Cathy Oke.

Minister for Health

Following the re-election of the Bracks government in late 2002, Pike was promoted to Minister for Health.

Minister for Education

On 2 August 2007, newly-appointed Premier John Brumby announced a cabinet reshuffle, which moved Pike from Minister for Health to Minister for Education.

Pike spearheaded the $1.9 billion Victorian Schools Plan to rebuild and modernise 500 Victorian schools over the four-year term of government. This included upgrades to technology wings; re-equipping science class rooms; building new schools in growth corridors. A key focus of this rebuilding program is encouraging joint-use of school and community facilities in areas ranging from libraries to sports fields. By 2011 more than 900 schools will have been rebuilt or modernised. The program has been tarnished by use of tactics to force school councils to vote for closure or merger of small schools by threatening to limit funds to the minimum amount as well as other tactics.

Later career
Among her positions since she left politics, Bronwyn Pike is the Chair of UnitingCare Australia and serves on the board of Uniting NSW and ACT. She is a lifelong member of the Uniting Church.

Honours
In 2022, Pike was appointed as a Member of the Order of Australia (AM) in the 2022 Australia Day Honours for "significant service to social welfare and not-for-profit organisations, and to the Parliament of Victoria".

References

External links
Personal Website 
Official profile

|-

|-

|-

1956 births
21st-century Australian politicians
21st-century Australian women politicians
Australian schoolteachers
Australian Labor Party members of the Parliament of Victoria
Living people
Members of the Order of Australia
Members of the Victorian Legislative Assembly
People educated at Immanuel College, Adelaide
University of Adelaide alumni
Women members of the Victorian Legislative Assembly